National Highway 1D (NH 1D), also known as Srinagar-Leh Highway, was a National Highway entirely within the union territory of Jammu and Kashmir and Ladakh in North India that connected Srinagar to Leh in Ladakh. It was one of the only two roads that connected Ladakh with the rest of India, the other being Leh-Manali Highway. The Srinagar-Leh Highway was declared as National Highway in 2006.

The old Central Asian trade route Srinagar-Leh-Yarkand was also known as the Treaty Road, after a commercial treaty signed in 1870  between Maharaja Ranbir Singh and Thomas Douglas Forsyth.

New numbering 
As of 2010 notification from Ministry of Road Transport and Highways, NH 1D has been renumbered as National Highway 1, along following route. 

Starting at Uri, Baramula, Srinagar, Kargil and terminating at Leh.

The route from Uri to Srinagar was part of old NH1A before renumbering.

Junction
  near Kashmir

Weather conditions
Heavy snowfall on the highest passes can block traffic, cutting Leh from Srinagar for some six months each year. During springtime, the Border Roads Organisation (BRO) plows snow and repairs damages caused by landslides.

Geography
For most part, NH 1D transited  through extremely treacherous terrain and followed the historic trade route along the Indus River, thus giving modern travelers a glimpse of villages which are historically and culturally important. The road generally remained open for traffic from early June to mid-November.

The two highest passes on NH 1D include Fotu La at  elevation and Zoji La at  elevation.

Between Fotu La pass and Leh, a government checkpoint is stationed in the village of Khalatse.

History
In the 17th and 18th centuries, the road was only a track, impassable even with ponies. Goods, mainly pashmina wool, were carried by porters from Yarkand and Tibet for the Kashmir shawl industry.

In the 19th century, the route was improved, allowing pony caravans to pass. This work was started after Dogra General Zorawar Singh conquered Ladakh region from the Sikh Empire during 1836–1840 Trans-Himalayan campaign and princely state of Jammu and Kashmir was formed when the British sold Kashmir to maharaja Gulab Singh in 1846 Treaty of Amritsar.

In April 1873, the Kashmir government allocated 2,500 rupees annually for upkeep of the Treaty Road and associated serais.

During the 1950s, tensions rose in Ladakh region. The political situation eroded, culminating in 1962 in the Sino-Indian War.

The road on the Chinese side gave PLA an advantage as a reliable supply line, giving the Indian Army impetus to build a road for supply and mobilisation of their own troops. The building started from Sringar in 1962, reaching Kargil in two years. This was the basis of modern Srinagar-Leh Highway. Building the road was hazardous task, given the challenging geographical location, and maintaining the road is still an unenviable task.

Restrictions on civilian traffic were lifted in 1974.

This highway was used as mobilisation route by the Indian Army during Pakistani occupation of Kargil in 1999, known as Operation Vijay.

Gallery

See also
 List of National Highways in India (by Highway Number)
 National Highways Development Project
 Origins of the Sino-Indian border dispute
 Sino-Indian War

References

External links
 Old NH 1D on OpenStreetMap
High Road To.. updates on the Sringar-Leh Road
NH 1D Map

1D
National highways in India (old numbering)
National Highways in Ladakh